10 Million Dollar Bigfoot Bounty is an American cryptozoology reality show that aired on Spike. The show premiered on January 10, 2014, and concluded its first season on February 21, 2014. The show is hosted by Dean Cain, Dr. Todd Disotell, and Natalia Reagan.

Premise
Nine teams of big-game hunters and Sasquatch hunters are instructed to find proof of Bigfoot, a hominid-esque figure reportedly seen in the wilderness. Each episode the teams are given a specific challenge and one team will be eliminated in each episode. If the teams manage to find evidence to prove the existence of Bigfoot, they will be awarded $10,000,000. However the proof must stand up to scientific testing in order for the team to receive the money. If no conclusive evidence is found, the teams will be eliminated until only one remains – at which point the remaining team will receive $100,000.

Contestant progress

Key
 (WINNER) The team won the competition.
 (RUNNER-UP) The team was the runner-up in the competition.
 (WIN) The team won the Field Challenge.
 (WIN) The team won the Field Challenge but was at risk of elimination.
 (WIN) The team won the Field Challenge but was eliminated.
 (SAFE) The team brought back sufficient evidence to move on in the competition.
 (RISK) The team brought back insufficient evidence and was at risk of elimination.
 (OUT) The team brought in the least evidence from the hunt and was eliminated from the competition.

Episodes

References

External links
 
 

2014 American television seasons
Television about Bigfoot
Spike (TV network) original programming
2010s American reality television series
2014 American television series debuts